Hedge Row Trench Cemetery is a Commonwealth War Graves Commission burial ground for the dead of the First World War located near The Bluff south of Ypres  (Ieper) in Belgium on the Western Front.

Foundation

The cemetery, also known as Ravine Wood Cemetery, was founded in March 1915 and closed in August 1917. Being directly on the front line, the cemetery was repeatedly shelled and the original locations of the graves could not be established. The majority of the stones are therefore arrayed in a circle around the Cross of Sacrifice and are marked "known to be buried in this cemetery", with the default additional phrase "Their glory shall not be blotted out", a line suggested by Rudyard Kipling.

The cemetery was designed by J R Truelove. The cemetery grounds were assigned to the United Kingdom in perpetuity by King Albert I of Belgium in recognition of the sacrifices made by the British Empire in the defence and liberation of Belgium during the war.

Other cemeteries on "The Bluff"
 First DCLI Commonwealth War Graves Commission Cemetery, The Bluff
 Woods Commonwealth War Graves Commission Cemetery

References

External links
 
 Hedge Row Trench Cemetery at Find a Grave

Commonwealth War Graves Commission cemeteries in Belgium
Cemeteries and memorials in West Flanders